The Handel Medallion is an American award presented by the City of New York. It is the city's highest award given to individuals for their contribution to the city's intellectual and cultural life.

Establishment
The award was first issued in 1959 to Virginia Portia Royall Inness-Brown, upon the 200th anniversary of the death of George Handel (1685–1759), the German-British Baroque composer, noted for his operas, oratorios, anthems and organ concertos. The award was established under New York City Mayor Robert F. Wagner Jr.

Award winners

Years unknown:

Ivan Davis
Justino Díaz
Geraldine Fitzgerald
Benny Goodman
Gary Graffman
Kitty Carlisle Hart
Robert Joffrey
Vincent La Selva
Jaime Laredo
Yehudi Menuhin
Renata Tebaldi
Peter Wilhousky

See also

 List of awards for contributions to culture

References

American awards
Arts awards in the United States
Awards for contributions to culture
Awards established in 1959
Culture of New York City
1959 establishments in New York City
Municipal awards
Government of New York City